The Farmfoods European Legends Links Championship  is a men's senior (over 50) professional golf tournament on the European Senior Tour. It was held for the first time in June 2019 at Trevose Golf & Country Club near Padstow, Cornwall, England. Prize money was €200,000.

Winners

References

External links
Coverage on the European Senior Tour's official site

European Senior Tour events
Golf tournaments in England
Recurring sporting events established in 2019